Dongting Lake Bridge is a bridge in China which carries the Haoji Railway across Dongting Lake. The bridge was opened with the Haoji Railway on 28 September 2019.

References 

Cable-stayed bridges in China
Bridges completed in 2019
Bridges in Hunan
2019 establishments in China
Rail transport in Hunan
Railway bridges in China